Waco Independent School District is a public school district based in Waco, Texas (USA).

The district serves Beverly Hills and most of Waco.

In 2009, the school district was rated "academically acceptable" by the Texas Education Agency.

Academics
"Waco ISD annually qualifies more students for State History Day than any other school district in Central Texas. In 2013, four Waco ISD students advanced to National History Day in College Park, Maryland."

Schools

High Schools (Grades 9-12)
 Waco High School
 University High School
Former high schools:
 A.J. Moore Academy (Magnet)
 Richfield High School (Closed)

Middle Schools (Grades 6-8)
ATLAS Academy (Magnet)*For GT students
 Cesar Chavez Middle
 G.W. Carver Middle
 Indian Spring Middle
 Lake Air Montessori (Magnet)
 Tennyson Middle

Elementary Schools (Grades PK-5)
Alta Vista
 Bell's Hill
 Brook Avenue
 Cedar Ridge
 Crestview
 Dean Highland
 Hillcrest Professional Development School (Magnet)
 J.H. Hines
 Kendrick
 Lake Air Montessori (Magnet)
 Mountainview (International Baccalaureate)
 Parkdale
 Provident Heights
 South Waco
 West Avenue

Other
Brazos High Credit Recovery
 Greater Waco Advanced Manufacturing Academy
 Wiley Opportunity Center (Alternative Campus)
 McLennan County Challenge Academy (Alternative Campus)

References

External links
Waco ISD

School districts in McLennan County, Texas
Education in Waco, Texas